Korsunov is a Russian masculine surname, its feminine counterpart is Korsunova. It may refer to:

 Mihail Korsunov (born 1963), Russian-born Estonian ice hockey player
 Veronika Korsunova (born 1992), Russian freestyle skier
 Vladimir Korsunov (born 1983), Russian ice hockey player

See also
 Korshunov

Russian-language surnames